Elizabeth Jane Cundy ( Miller; born 2 May 1968) is an English socialite, TV personality and former wife of footballer Jason Cundy.

Career
Cundy appeared on ITV's This Morning on their A Day with a Designer series and has since regularly appeared on debates and features. She covered the FIFA World Cup for GMTV and became one of their main debate specialists. In 2010, Cundy and her husband Jason both won Celebrity Four Weddings, Lizzie faced David Van Day, Katie Hopkins and Francine Lewis. In 2012 Cundy became the red carpet reporter for ITV2's film review show ITV at the Movies alongside David Bass and James King. She had a beauty and style column in Town and Country House and a show business column for OK! Magazine and the Daily Express. Cundy starred as the main lead in the West End Musical 'WAGS' 2014.

Cundy hosted her own football show called Wags World, and was the main Showbiz reporter for OKTV. Cundy was a "Grid Girl" for Formula 1 racing, and criticised the end of the use of "Grid Girls". She works and features on This Morning, Good Morning Britain, The Alan Titchmarsh Show and Sky News.

Cundy formerly hosted a show called WAGS World on Wedding TV. Additionally, she co-hosts the reality makeover programme called So Would You Dump Me Now? with Sue Moxley also for Sky Wedding TV. She is also filming Sporting Icon WAGS and appears as a guest on This Morning, with more than fifty appearances since 2008 on ITV, and Celebrity Big Brother's Bit on the Side from 2012 to 2018.

Cundy is a radio presenter for FUBAR Radio, hosting a weekly showbiz chat show called Access All Areas with journalist Stephen Leng.

Personal life
Cundy married Chelsea footballer Jason Cundy in 1994; they separated in 2010 and divorced in December 2012. They have two children together. She is a supporter of the Conservative Party.

References

External links

 Twitter account

English television presenters
English fashion journalists
Living people
English women journalists
Place of birth missing (living people)
Alumni of the Royal Central School of Speech and Drama
20th-century British journalists
21st-century British journalists
20th-century English women
20th-century English people
21st-century English women
21st-century English people
1968 births